Sunny Side is an unincorporated community in Buckingham and Cumberland counties, in the U.S. state of Virginia. Sunny Side was a stop on the Farmville and Powhatan Railroad from 1884 to 1905 and then on the Tidewater and Western Railroad from 1905 to 1917.  It is on the new Virginia State Route 13 between Powhatan, Virginia and Cumberland, Virginia from 1918 to today.

References

Unincorporated communities in Virginia
Unincorporated communities in Buckingham County, Virginia
Unincorporated communities in Cumberland County, Virginia